Hindu Temple of Las Vegas or HTLV, is a Hindu temple located in Summerlin, Nevada. It is one of two Hindu temples in the Las Vegas Valley. HTLV is targeted specifically for worshipers of Sanatana Dharma.  HTLV also contains an area for Jains to worship at.

History
In 1994, Hindus in the Las Vegas area banded together to create The Hindu Society of Nevada. The land that would later become part of the Temple Campus was bought in 1997. In 2000, the Temple started construction and by April 2001, the Hindu Temple was finished.

References 

Buildings and structures in Clark County, Nevada
Hinduism in the United States
Religious buildings and structures completed in 2001
2001 establishments in Nevada
Religious organizations established in 1994
Indian-American culture in Nevada
Asian-American culture in Nevada